David Bryant Kimble  (May 12, 1921 – March 8, 2009) was a British academic whose career was spent mostly in Tanzania, Botswana, Lesotho, Eswatini and Malawi. He was Vice-Chancellor of the University of Malawi from 1977 to 1987.

Biographical details 

Kimble was born in Horam, Sussex, into a family of Plymouth Brethren. He attended Eastbourne Grammar School and Reading University where he took a degree in modern studies, graduating in 1942 before taking a postgraduate diploma in education.

Career 

In the late 1940s Kimble took up the position of resident tutor in the Gold Coast (now Ghana).

In 1960 he was awarded a PhD by the University of London for his thesis on the rise of nationalism, forming the basis for his book The Political History of Ghana Vol 1: 1850–1928, published in 1962.

In 1962 Kimble became Professor of Political Science at the University College of Dar es Salaam; in 1966, he began a two-year stint as director of the Institute of Public Administration there. From 1968 to 1971 he was in Tangier at CAFRAD, an agency dedicated to improving public administration.

In 1971 he was appointed  Professor in government and administration at the University of Botswana, Lesotho, and Swaziland.

In 1977 he was appointed Vice-Chancellor of the University of Malawi, and retired in 1987 to Devon, where he continued to edit the Journal of Modern African Studies. In all he edited or co-edited 35 annual volumes of the journal.

Awards 

Kimble was appointed OBE in 1962 for services to adult education, and was made an Officier de l’Ordre des Palmes Academiques in 1982.

References

Sources 

 David Kimble, Obituary, The Times

British expatriate academics
Academic staff of the University of Malawi
1921 births
2009 deaths
Alumni of the University of Reading
Alumni of the University of London
Officers of the Order of the British Empire
Officiers of the Ordre des Palmes Académiques
Academic staff of the University of Dar es Salaam
British Africanists
Vice-chancellors of universities in Malawi
British expatriates in Tanzania
British expatriates in Lesotho
Expatriates in Eswatini
British expatriates in Malawi
British expatriates in Botswana